Nasty Little Thoughts is the third studio album by American rock band Stroke 9. It was released on September 7, 1999, by Universal Records. 

It was certified Gold by the RIAA on April 21, 2000 and yielded 2 singles: "Little Black Backpack" and "Letters", which charted the Billboard Modern Rock Tracks. The album charted the Top Heatseekers chart.

Critical reception

The San Francisco Examiner wrote that the album "is chockablock with hooks the size of battleship anchors, as well as enough meaty guitar and excellent singing—plus a nice blend of boyish introspection and lighthearted humor—to keep Stroke 9 on the radio for the next eon."

Track listing
 "Letters"
 "City Life"
 "Little Black Backpack"
 "Tail Of The Sun"
 "Washin' + Wonderin'"
 "Make It Last"
 "Are You In This?"
 "Not Nothin'"
 "One Time"
 "Down"
 "Angels"
 "Tear Me In Two"

References

Stroke 9 albums
1999 albums
Albums produced by Jerry Harrison
Albums produced by Rupert Hine